Cameron Gordon may refer to:

 Cameron Gordon (mathematician), professor of mathematics at the University of Texas, Austin
 Cam Gordon, Green Party councillor for Minneapolis, Minnesota
 Cameron Gordon (American football) (born 1991), American football linebacker

See also
Gordon Cameron (disambiguation)
Cam Gordon (rugby union), Australian rugby union player whose full name is George Campbell Gordon